Mello da Gubbio, also called Mello de Eugubio or Nello da Gubbio, (active 1330– 1360),was an Italian painter, active in Gubbio.

Biography
Little is known of his biography. He is described as a pupil of Guido Palmerucci, to whom some of his paintings had been attributed. One such painting was the Madonna in Glory with Angels, signed Opus Melli de Eugubio, now housed in the Museo Diocesano of Gubbio, but which came from the Pieve d’ Agnano outside Umbertide. There is another Madonna and Child with gilded background at the Pinacoteca of Gubbio.

References

Year of birth unknown
Year of death unknown
People from Gubbio
14th-century Italian painters
Italian male painters
Umbrian painters